MediaStorm is a New York City-based film production and interactive design studio. The company produces online news stories using high-quality photography, audio, interactivity, and video, and consults on interactive web projects. Seattle Post-Intelligencer said that "telling powerful stories through powerful images, MediaStorm has earned a reputation for engaging multimedia news."

The company aims to give voice and meaning to pressing issues of our time, using their projects to “demystify complex issues, humanize statistics, and inspire audiences to take action on issues that matter.”

Content and services 
The MediaStorm website showcases in-depth feature stories with an emphasis on photojournalism and social commentary. Their films have been picked up by major media outlets, such as The Los Angeles Times, The New York Times, The Atlantic, and The Washington Post. Notable projects include Marlboro Marine, The Sandwich Generation, Driftless, BLOODLINE: AIDS and Family, and Never Coming Home. An innovation of MediaStorm's business model is running auctions for media agencies to bid for the rights to run their stories. The site also offers for sale books that films are based on, music from the works, and other products from the film producers.

In addition to in-house projects, the company partners with a range of clients on commissioned work to address communications challenges. Its clients include Apple Inc, the Council on Foreign Relations, The Los Angeles Times, MSNBC, National Geographic, and Starbucks, the first corporate client.

MediaStorm offers intensive specialized workshops on multimedia storytelling   in addition to providing free documentation on gathering audio, producing with Apple's Final Cut and Adobe Premiere Pro, as well as details on audio and video equipment on the company blog.

History 
MediaStorm was founded on 16 November 2005 by Brian Storm, a graduate of the University of Missouri in photojournalism, a former director of multimedia at MSNBC.com and a former vice president of News, Multimedia & Assignment Services for Corbis, who wanted to get back to his "publishing roots". In 2010, MediaStorm underwent a major site redesign.

Awards 
In 2013, MediaStorm was awarded the Edward R. Murrow Award for National Online News Organization Website. Since 2010, the company has been nominated for 15 Emmy Awards and won two Alfred Dupont Awards. In 2008, MediaStorm won an Emmy with the Council on Foreign Relations for Crisis Guide: Darfur, two Webby Awards and Best Use of Multimedia in the Pictures of the Year Contest. In 2007, MediaStorm won an Emmy for Kingsley's Crossing by Olivier Jobard, took first place in both the Best of Photojournalism Contest and Pictures of the Year, and won the Webby Award for the Magazine category.

See also
Photojournalism
Multimedia

References

External links
 
Nieman Reports interview with Brian Storm on long-form multimedia journalism
Canon interview with Brian Storm on storytelling
Video interview with Brian Storm by PoynterOnline

American news websites
Photojournalism publications
Companies based in New York City
Mass media companies of the United States